Tegrodera is a genus beetles known as iron cross blister beetles and iron cross soldier beetles. They are in the family Meloidae. There are at least three described species in Tegrodera.

Species
These three species belong to the genus Tegrodera:
 Tegrodera aloga Skinner, 1903 i c g b (iron cross blister beetle)
 Tegrodera erosa LeConte, 1851 i c g b
 Tegrodera latecincta Horn, 1891 i c g b (iron cross blister beetle)
Data sources: i = ITIS, c = Catalogue of Life, g = GBIF, b = Bugguide.net

References

Further reading

External links

 

Meloidae
Articles created by Qbugbot